This is a list of the bird species recorded in the Cayman Islands. The avifauna of the Cayman Islands included a total of 267 species, according to Bird Checklists of the World as of July 2022. Of them, 163 are rare or accidental and eight are introduced. One species (Grand Cayman thrush) was endemic to the islands but is now extinct, and one species (Jamaican oriole) has been extirpated. BirdLife International has reclassified Grand Cayman's endemic Cuban bullfinch subspecies as a full species, the Grand Cayman bullfinch, but the AOS has not yet accepted this. In addition, the islands hold most of the world population of vitelline warbler which otherwise occurs only on the Swan Islands of Honduras. There are 17 endemic subspecies belonging to 14 different species.

This list is presented in the taxonomic sequence of the Check-list of North and Middle American Birds, 7th edition through the 63rd Supplement, published by the American Ornithological Society (AOS). Common and scientific names are also those of the Check-list, except that the common names of families are from the Clements taxonomy because the AOS list does not include them.

The following tags have been used to highlight several categories of occurrence.

(A) Accidental - a species that rarely or accidentally occurs in the Cayman Islands
(E) Endemic - a species endemic to the Cayman Islands
(I) Introduced - a species introduced by humans either directly to the Cayman Islands or elsewhere in the New World

Ducks, geese, and waterfowl
Order: AnseriformesFamily: Anatidae

Anatidae includes the ducks and most duck-like waterfowl, such as geese and swans. These birds are adapted to an aquatic existence with webbed feet, flattened bills, and feathers that are excellent at shedding water due to an oily coating.

Black-bellied whistling-duck, Dendrocygna autumnalis (A)
West Indian whistling-duck, Dendrocygna arborea
Fulvous whistling-duck, Dendrocygna bicolor (A)
Snow goose, Anser caerulescens (A)
Canada goose, Branta canadensis (A)
Wood duck, Aix sponsa (A)
Blue-winged teal, Spatula discors
Cinnamon teal, Spatula cyanoptera (A)
Northern shoveler, Spatula clypeata (A)
Gadwall, Mareca strepera (A)
American wigeon, Mareca americana (A)
Mallard, Anas platyrhynchos (A)
White-cheeked pintail, Anas bahamensis (A)
Northern pintail, Anas acuta (A)
Green-winged teal, Anas crecca (A)
Redhead, Aythya americana (A)
Ring-necked duck, Aythya collaris (A)
Lesser scaup, Aythya affinis
Hooded merganser, Lophodytes cucullatus (A)
Common merganser, Mergus merganser (A)
Red-breasted merganser, Mergus serrator (A)
Masked duck, Nomonyx dominicus (A)
Ruddy duck, Oxyura jamaicensis (A)

Flamingos
Order: PhoenicopteriformesFamily: Phoenicopteridae

Flamingos filter-feed on shellfish and algae. Their oddly shaped beaks are specially adapted to separate mud and silt from the food they consume and, uniquely, are used upside-down.

American flamingo, Phoenicopterus ruber (A)

Grebes
Order: PodicipediformesFamily: Podicipedidae

Grebes are small to medium-large freshwater diving birds. They have lobed toes and are excellent swimmers and divers. However, they have their feet placed far back on the body, making them quite ungainly on land.

Least grebe, Tachybaptus dominicus (A)
Pied-billed grebe, Podilymbus podiceps

Pigeons and doves
Order: ColumbiformesFamily: Columbidae

Pigeons and doves are stout-bodied birds with short necks and short slender bills with a fleshy cere.

Rock pigeon, Columba livia (I)
White-crowned pigeon, Patagioenas leucocephala
Eurasian collared-dove, Streptopelia decaocto (I)  
Common ground dove, Columbina passerina
Caribbean dove, Leptotila jamaicensis
White-winged dove, Zenaida asiatica
Zenaida dove, Zenaida aurita
Mourning dove, Zenaida macroura

Cuckoos
Order: CuculiformesFamily: Cuculidae

The family Cuculidae includes cuckoos, roadrunners, and anis. These birds are of variable size with slender bodies, long tails, and strong legs.

Smooth-billed ani, Crotophaga ani
Yellow-billed cuckoo, Coccyzus americanus (A)
Mangrove cuckoo, Coccyzus minor
Black-billed cuckoo, Coccyzus erythropthalmus (A)

Nightjars and allies
Order: CaprimulgiformesFamily: Caprimulgidae

Nightjars are medium-sized nocturnal birds that usually nest on the ground. They have long wings, short legs, and very short bills. Most have small feet, of little use for walking, and long pointed wings. Their soft plumage is camouflaged to resemble bark or leaves.

Common nighthawk, Chordeiles minor (A)
Antillean nighthawk, Chordeiles gundlachii
Chuck-will's-widow, Antrostomus carolinensis (A)

Potoos
Order: NyctibiiformesFamily: Nyctibiidae

The potoos (sometimes called poor-me-ones) are large near passerine birds related to the nightjars and frogmouths. They are nocturnal insectivores which lack the bristles around the mouth found in the true nightjars.

Northern potoo, Nyctibius jamaicensis (A)

Swifts
Order: ApodiformesFamily: Apodidae

Swifts are small birds which spend the majority of their lives flying. These birds have very short legs and never settle voluntarily on the ground, perching instead only on vertical surfaces. Many swifts have long swept-back wings which resemble a crescent or boomerang.

Black swift, Cypseloides niger (A)
Chimney swift, Chaetura pelagica (A)
Antillean palm-swift, Tachornis phoenicobia (A)

Hummingbirds
Order: ApodiformesFamily: Trochilidae

Hummingbirds are small birds capable of hovering in mid-air due to the rapid flapping of their wings. They are the only birds that can fly backwards.

Ruby-throated hummingbird, Archilochus colubris (A)

Rails, gallinules, and coots
Order: GruiformesFamily: Rallidae

Rallidae is a large family of small to medium-sized birds which includes the rails, crakes, coots, and gallinules. Typically they inhabit dense vegetation in damp environments near lakes, swamps, or rivers. In general they are shy and secretive birds, making them difficult to observe. Most species have strong legs and long toes which are well adapted to soft uneven surfaces. They tend to have short, rounded wings and to be weak fliers.

Sora, Porzana carolina
Common gallinule, Gallinula galeata
American coot, Fulica americana
Purple gallinule, Porphyrio martinica
Black rail, 	Laterallus jamaicensis (A)

Limpkin
Order: GruiformesFamily: Aramidae

The limpkin is an odd bird that looks like a large rail, but is skeletally closer to the cranes. It is found in marshes with some trees or scrub in the Caribbean, South America, and southern Florida.

Limpkin, Aramus guarauna (A)

Stilts and avocets
Order: CharadriiformesFamily: Recurvirostridae

Recurvirostridae is a family of large wading birds which includes the avocets and stilts. The avocets have long legs and long up-curved bills. The stilts have extremely long legs and long, thin, straight bills.

Black-necked stilt, Himantopus mexicanus
American avocet, Recurvirostra americana

Plovers and lapwings
Order: CharadriiformesFamily: Charadriidae

The family Charadriidae includes the plovers, dotterels, and lapwings. They are small to medium-sized birds with compact bodies, short thick necks, and long, usually pointed, wings. They are found in open country worldwide, mostly in habitats near water.

Black-bellied plover, Pluvialis squatarola
American golden-plover, Pluvialis dominica (A)
Pacific golden-plover, Pluvialis fulva (A) 
Killdeer, Charadrius vociferus (A)
Semipalmated plover, Charadrius semipalmatus
Wilson's plover, Charadrius wilsonia (A)
Snowy plover, Charadrius nivosus (A)

Sandpipers and allies
Order: CharadriiformesFamily: Scolopacidae

Scolopacidae is a large diverse family of small to medium-sized shorebirds including the sandpipers, curlews, godwits, shanks, tattlers, woodcocks, snipes, dowitchers, and phalaropes. The majority of these species eat small invertebrates picked out of the mud or soil. Variation in length of legs and bills enables multiple species to feed in the same habitat, particularly on the coast, without direct competition for food.

Upland sandpiper, Bartramia longicauda (A)
Whimbrel, Numenius phaeopus (A)
Hudsonian godwit, Limosa haemastica (A)
Marbled godwit, Limosa fedoa (A)
Ruddy turnstone, Arenaria interpres
Red knot, Calidris canutus (A)
Ruff, Calidris pugnax (A)
Stilt sandpiper, Calidris himantopus (A)
Sanderling, Calidris alba (A)
Dunlin, Calidris alpina (A)
Baird's sandpiper, Calidris bairdii (A)
Least sandpiper, Calidris minutilla
White-rumped sandpiper, Calidris fuscicollis (A)
Buff-breasted sandpiper, Calidris subruficollis (A)
Pectoral sandpiper, Calidris melanotos (A)
Semipalmated sandpiper, Calidris pusilla
Western sandpiper, Calidris mauri (A)
Short-billed dowitcher, Limnodromus griseus
Long-billed dowitcher, Limnodromus scolopaceus (A)
Wilson's snipe, Gallinago delicata (A)
Spotted sandpiper, Actitis macularia
Solitary sandpiper, Tringa solitaria
Lesser yellowlegs, Tringa flavipes
Willet, Tringa semipalmata
Greater yellowlegs, Tringa melanoleuca
Wilson's phalarope, Phalaropus tricolor (A)

Skuas and jaegers
Order: CharadriiformesFamily: Stercorariidae

The family Stercorariidae are, in general, medium to large birds, typically with grey or brown plumage, often with white markings on the wings. They nest on the ground in temperate and arctic regions and are long-distance migrants.

Long-tailed jaeger, Stercorarius longicaudus (A)

Gulls, terns, and skimmers
Order: CharadriiformesFamily: Laridae

Laridae is a family of medium to large seabirds and includes gulls, kittiwakes, terns, and skimmers. They are typically grey or white, often with black markings on the head or wings. They have longish bills and webbed feet. Terns are a group of generally medium to large seabirds typically with grey or white plumage, often with black markings on the head. Most terns hunt fish by diving but some pick insects off the surface of fresh water. Terns are generally long-lived birds, with several species known to live in excess of 30 years. Skimmers are a small family of tropical tern-like birds. They have an elongated lower mandible which they use to feed by flying low over the water surface and skimming the water for small fish.

Bonaparte's gull, Chroicocephalus philadelphia (A)
Laughing gull, Leucophaeus atricilla
Franklin's gull, Leucophaeus pipixcan (A)  
Ring-billed gull, Larus delawarensis (A)
Herring gull, Larus argentatus (A)
Brown noddy, Anous stolidus (A)
Sooty tern, Onychoprion fuscata (A)
Bridled tern, Onychoprion anaethetus (A)
Least tern, Sternula antillarum
Gull-billed tern, Gelochelidon nilotica (A)
Caspian tern, Hydroprogne caspia (A)
Black tern, Chlidonias niger (A)
Roseate tern, Sterna dougallii (A)
Common tern, Sterna hirundo (A)
Forster's tern, Sterna forsteri (A)
Royal tern, Thalasseus maxima
Sandwich tern, Thalasseus sandvicensis (A)
Black skimmer, Rynchops niger (A)

Tropicbirds
Order: PhaethontiformesFamily: Phaethontidae

Tropicbirds are slender white birds of tropical oceans with exceptionally long central tail feathers. Their heads and long wings have black markings.

White-tailed tropicbird, Phaethon lepturus

Shearwaters and petrels
Order: ProcellariiformesFamily: Procellariidae

The procellariids are the main group of medium-sized "true petrels", characterised by united nostrils with medium septum and a long outer functional primary.

Black-capped petrel, Pterodroma hasitata (A)
Cory's shearwater, Calonectris diomedea (A) 
Great shearwater, Ardenna gravis (A)
Audubon's shearwater, Puffinus lherminieri (A)

Frigatebirds
Order: SuliformesFamily: Fregatidae

Frigatebirds are large seabirds usually found over tropical oceans. They are large, black-and-white, or completely black, with long wings and deeply forked tails. The males have coloured inflatable throat pouches. They do not swim or walk and cannot take off from a flat surface. Having the largest wingspan-to-body-weight ratio of any bird, they are essentially aerial, able to stay aloft for more than a week.

Magnificent frigatebird, Fregata magnificens

Boobies and gannets
Order: SuliformesFamily: Sulidae

The sulids comprise the gannets and boobies. Both groups are medium to large coastal seabirds that plunge-dive for fish.

Masked booby, Sula dactylatra (A)
Brown booby, Sula leucogaster
Red-footed booby, Sula sula

Anhingas
Order: SuliformesFamily: Anhingidae

Anhingas are often called "snake-birds" because of their long thin neck, which gives a snake-like appearance when they swim with their bodies submerged. The males have black and dark-brown plumage, an erectile crest on the nape, and a larger bill than the female. The females have much paler plumage especially on the neck and underparts. The darters have completely webbed feet and their legs are short and set far back on the body. Their plumage is somewhat permeable, like that of cormorants, and they spread their wings to dry after diving.

Anhinga, Anhinga anhinga (A)

Cormorants and shags
Order: SuliformesFamily: Phalacrocoracidae

Phalacrocoracidae is a family of medium to large coastal, fish-eating seabirds that includes cormorants and shags. Plumage colouration varies, with the majority having mainly dark plumage, some species being black-and-white, and a few being colourful.

Double-crested cormorant, Nannopterum auritum (A)

Pelicans
Order: PelecaniformesFamily: Pelecanidae

Pelicans are large water birds with a distinctive pouch under their beak. As with other members of the order Pelecaniformes, they have webbed feet with four toes.

American white pelican, Pelecanus erythrorhynchos (A)
Brown pelican, Pelecanus occidentalis

Herons, egrets, and bitterns
Order: PelecaniformesFamily: Ardeidae

The family Ardeidae contains the bitterns, herons, and egrets. Herons and egrets are medium to large wading birds with long necks and legs. Bitterns tend to be shorter necked and more wary. Members of Ardeidae fly with their necks retracted, unlike other long-necked birds such as storks, ibises, and spoonbills.

American bittern, Botaurus lentiginosus (A)
Least bittern, Ixobrychus exilis
Great blue heron, Ardea herodias
Great egret, Ardea alba
Snowy egret, Egretta thula
Little blue heron, Egretta caerulea
Tricolored heron, Egretta tricolor
Reddish egret, Egretta rufescens (A)
Cattle egret, Bubulcus ibis
Green heron, Butorides virescens
Black-crowned night-heron, Nycticorax nycticorax
Yellow-crowned night-heron, Nyctanassa violacea

Ibises and spoonbills
Order: PelecaniformesFamily: Threskiornithidae

Threskiornithidae is a family of large terrestrial and wading birds which includes the ibises and spoonbills. They have long, broad wings with 11 primary and about 20 secondary feathers. They are strong fliers and despite their size and weight, very capable soarers.

White ibis, Eudocimus albus (A)
Glossy ibis, Plegadis falcinellus (A)
Roseate spoonbill, Platalea ajaja (A)

New World vultures
Order: CathartiformesFamily: Cathartidae

The New World vultures are not closely related to Old World vultures, but superficially resemble them because of convergent evolution. Like the Old World vultures, they are scavengers. However, unlike Old World vultures, which find carcasses by sight, New World vultures have a good sense of smell with which they locate carrion.

Black vulture, Coragyps atratus (A)
Turkey vulture, Cathartes aura

Osprey
Order: AccipitriformesFamily: Pandionidae

The family Pandionidae contains only one species, the osprey. The osprey is a medium-large raptor which is a specialist fish-eater with a worldwide distribution.

Osprey, Pandion haliaetus

Hawks, eagles, and kites
Order: AccipitriformesFamily: Accipitridae

Accipitridae is a family of birds of prey, which includes hawks, eagles, kites, harriers, and Old World vultures. These birds have powerful hooked beaks for tearing flesh from their prey, strong legs, powerful talons, and keen eyesight.

Swallow-tailed kite, Elanoides forficatus (A)
Northern harrier, Circus hudsonius (A)
Mississippi kite, Ictinia mississippiensis (A)
Common black hawk, Buteogallus anthracinus (A)
Cuban black hawk, Buteogallus gundlachii (A)
Red-tailed hawk, Buteo jamaicensis (A)

Barn-owls
Order: StrigiformesFamily: Tytonidae

Barn-owls are medium to large owls with large heads and characteristic heart-shaped faces. They have long strong legs with powerful talons.

Barn owl, Tyto alba

Owls
Order: StrigiformesFamily: Strigidae

The typical owls are small to large solitary nocturnal birds of prey. They have large forward-facing eyes and ears, a hawk-like beak, and a conspicuous circle of feathers around each eye called a facial disk.

Short-eared owl, Asio flammeus (A)

Kingfishers

Order: CoraciiformesFamily: Alcedinidae

Kingfishers are medium-sized birds with large heads, long, pointed bills, short legs, and stubby tails.

Belted kingfisher, Megaceryle alcyon

Woodpeckers
Order: PiciformesFamily: Picidae

Woodpeckers are small to medium-sized birds with chisel-like beaks, short legs, stiff tails, and long tongues used for capturing insects. Some species have feet with two toes pointing forward and two backward, while several species have only three toes. Many woodpeckers have the habit of tapping noisily on tree trunks with their beaks.

West Indian woodpecker, Melanerpes superciliaris
Yellow-bellied sapsucker, Sphyrapicus varius
Northern flicker, Colaptes auratus

Falcons and caracaras
Order: FalconiformesFamily: Falconidae

Falconidae is a family of diurnal birds of prey. They differ from hawks, eagles, and kites in that they kill with their beaks instead of their talons.

American kestrel, Falco sparverius
Merlin, Falco columbarius
Peregrine falcon, Falco peregrinus

New World and African parrots
Order: PsittaciformesFamily: Psittacidae

Parrots are small to large birds with a characteristic curved beak. Their upper mandibles have slight mobility in the joint with the skull and they have a generally erect stance. All parrots are zygodactyl, having the four toes on each foot placed two at the front and two to the back.

Monk parakeet, Myiopsitta monachus (I)
Cuban parrot, Amazona leucocephala

Tyrant flycatchers

Order: PasseriformesFamily: Tyrannidae

Tyrant flycatchers are passerine birds which occur throughout North and South America. They superficially resemble the Old World flycatchers, but are more robust and have stronger bills. They do not have the sophisticated vocal capabilities of the songbirds. Most, but not all, have plain colouring. As the name implies, most are insectivorous.

Caribbean elaenia, Elaenia martinica
Eastern wood-pewee, Contopus virens (A)
Great crested flycatcher, Myiarchus crinitus (A)
La Sagra's flycatcher, Myiarchus sagrae
Tropical kingbird, Tyrannus melancholicus (A)
Eastern kingbird, Tyrannus tyrannus (A)
Gray kingbird, Tyrannus dominicensis
Loggerhead kingbird, Tyrannus caudifasciatus
Fork-tailed flycatcher, Tyrannus savana (A)
Scissor-tailed flycatcher, Tyrannus forficatus(A)
Acadian flycatcher, Empidonax virescens (A)
Alder flycatcher, Empidonax alnorum (A)
Least flycatcher, Empidonax minimus (A)
Yellow-bellied flycatcher, Empidonax flaviventris (A)
Eastern phoebe, Sayornis phoebe (A)

Vireos, shrike-babblers, and erpornis

Order: PasseriformesFamily: Vireonidae

The vireos are a group of small to medium-sized passerine birds. They are typically greenish in colour and resemble New World warblers apart from their heavier bills.

White-eyed vireo, Vireo griseus
Thick-billed vireo, Vireo crassirostris
Yellow-throated vireo, Vireo flavifrons (A)
Blue-headed vireo, Vireo solitarius (A)
Philadelphia vireo, Vireo philadelphicus (A)
Red-eyed vireo, Vireo olivaceus 
Black-whiskered vireo, Vireo altiloquus
Yucatan vireo, Vireo magister

Swallows

Order: PasseriformesFamily: Hirundinidae

The family Hirundinidae is adapted to aerial feeding. They have a slender streamlined body, long pointed wings, and a short bill with a wide gape. The feet are adapted to perching rather than walking, and the front toes are partially joined at the base.

Bank swallow, Riparia riparia (A)
Tree swallow, Tachycineta bicolor
Northern rough-winged swallow, Stelgidopteryx serripennis (A)
Purple martin, Progne subis
Cuban martin, Progne cryptoleuca (A)
Caribbean martin, Progne dominicensis (A)
Barn swallow, Hirundo rustica
Cliff swallow, Petrochelidon pyrrhonota (A)
Cave swallow, Petrochelidon fulva (A)

Kinglets
Order: PasseriformesFamily: Regulidae

The kinglets and "crests" are a small family of birds which resemble some warblers. They are very small insectivorous birds in the single genus Regulus. The adults have coloured crowns, giving rise to their name.

Ruby-crowned kinglet, Corthylio calendula (A)

Waxwings
Order: PasseriformesFamily: Bombycillidae

The waxwings are a group of birds with soft silky plumage and unique red tips to some of the wing feathers. In the Bohemian and cedar waxwings, these tips look like sealing wax and give the group its name. These are arboreal birds of northern forests. They live on insects in summer and berries in winter.

Cedar waxwing, Bombycilla cedrorum (A)

Gnatcatchers
Order: PasseriformesFamily: Polioptilidae

These dainty birds resemble Old World warblers in their build and habits, moving restlessly through the foliage seeking insects. The gnatcatchers and gnatwrens are mainly soft bluish grey in colour and have the typical insectivore's long sharp bill. They are birds of fairly open woodland or scrub, which nest in bushes or trees.

Blue-gray gnatcatcher, Polioptila caerulea (A)

Mockingbirds and allies

Order: PasseriformesFamily: Mimidae

The mimids are a family of passerine birds that includes thrashers, mockingbirds, tremblers, and the New World catbirds. These birds are notable for their vocalizations, especially their ability to mimic a wide variety of birds and other sounds heard outdoors. Their colouring tends towards dull-greys and browns.

Gray catbird, Dumetella carolinensis
Northern mockingbird, Mimus polyglottos

Starlings
Order: PasseriformesFamily: Sturnidae

Starlings are small to medium-sized passerine birds. Their flight is strong and direct and they are very gregarious. Their preferred habitat is fairly open country. They eat insects and fruit. Plumage is typically dark with a metallic sheen.

European starling, Sturnus vulgaris (I) (A)

Thrushes and allies

Order: PasseriformesFamily: Turdidae

The thrushes are a group of passerine birds that occur mainly in the Old World. They are plump, soft plumaged, small to medium-sized insectivores or sometimes omnivores, often feeding on the ground. Many have attractive songs.

Veery, Catharus fuscescens (A)
Gray-cheeked thrush, Catharus minimus (A)
Swainson's thrush, Catharus ustulatus (A)
Wood thrush, Hylocichla mustelina (A)
Grand Cayman thrush, Turdus ravidus (E) (Extinct)
Red-legged thrush, Turdus plumbeus

Waxbills and allies
Order: PasseriformesFamily: Estrildidae

The estrildid finches are small passerine birds native to the Old World tropics. They are gregarious and often colonial seed eaters with short thick but pointed bills. They are all similar in structure and habits, but have wide variation in plumage colours and patterns.

Scaly-breasted munia, Lonchura punctulata (I) (A)
Tricolored munia, Lonchura malacca (I) (A)

Old World sparrows
Order: PasseriformesFamily: Emberizidae

Old World sparrows are small passerine birds. In general, sparrows tend to be small plump brownish or greyish birds with short tails and short powerful beaks. Sparrows are seed eaters, but they also consume small insects.

House sparrow, Passer domesticus (I)

New World sparrows
Order: PasseriformesFamily: Passerellidae

Until 2017, these species were considered part of the family Emberizidae. Most of the species are known as sparrows, but these birds are not closely related to the Old World sparrows which are in the family Passeridae. Many of these have distinctive head patterns.

Grasshopper sparrow, Ammodramus savannarum (A)
Chipping sparrow, Spizella passerina (A)
Clay-colored sparrow, Spizella pallida (A)
Dark-eyed junco, Junco hyemalis (A)
White-crowned sparrow, Zonotrichia leucophrys (A)
Vesper sparrow, Pooecetes gramineus (A)
Savannah sparrow, Passerculus sandwichensis (A)
Lark sparrow, Chondestes grammacus (A)

Spindalises
Order: PasseriformesFamily: Spindalidae

The members of this small family are native to the Greater Antilles. They were formerly classified as tanagers (family Thraupidae) but were placed in their own family in 2017.

Western spindalis, Spindalis zena

Yellow-breasted chat
Order: PasseriformesFamily: Icteriidae

This species was historically placed in the New World warblers (Parulidae) but nonetheless most authorities were unsure if it belonged there. It was placed in its own family in 2017.

Yellow-breasted chat, Icteria virens (A)

Troupials and allies

Order: PasseriformesFamily: Icteridae

The icterids are a group of small to medium-sized, often colourful, passerine birds restricted to the New World and include the grackles, New World blackbirds, and New World orioles. Most species have black as the predominant plumage colour, often enlivened by yellow, orange, or red.

Yellow-headed blackbird, Xanthocephalus xanthocephalus (A)
Bobolink, Dolichonyx oryzivorus (A)
Orchard oriole, Icterus spurius (A)  
Jamaican oriole, Icterus leucopteryx (Extirpated)
Baltimore oriole, Icterus galbula (A)
Tawny-shouldered blackbird, Agelaius humeralis (A)
Shiny cowbird, Molothrus bonariensis (A)
Greater Antillean grackle, Quiscalus niger

New World warblers

Order: PasseriformesFamily: Parulidae

The New World warblers are a group of small, often colourful, passerine birds restricted to the New World. Most are arboreal, but some are terrestrial. Most members of this family are insectivores.

Ovenbird, Seiurus aurocapilla
Worm-eating warbler, Helmitheros vermivorum
Louisiana waterthrush, Parkesia motacilla (A)
Northern waterthrush, Parkesia noveboracensis
Golden-winged warbler, Vermivora chrysoptera (A)
Blue-winged warbler, Vermivora cyanoptera (A)
Black-and-white warbler, Mniotilta varia
Prothonotary warbler, Protonotaria citrea (A)
Swainson's warbler, Limnothlypis swainsonii (A)
Tennessee warbler, Leiothlypis peregrina (A)
Orange-crowned warbler, Leiothlypis celata (A)
Nashville warbler, Leiothlypis ruficapilla (A)
Connecticut warbler, Oporornis agilis (A)
Mourning warbler, Geothlypis philadelphia (A)
Kentucky warbler, Geothlypis formosa (A)
Common yellowthroat, Geothlypis trichas
Hooded warbler, Setophaga citrina (A)
American redstart, Setophaga ruticilla
Cape May warbler, Setophaga tigrina
Cerulean warbler, Setophaga cerulea (A)
Northern parula, Setophaga americana
Magnolia warbler, Setophaga magnolia
Bay-breasted warbler, Setophaga castanea (A)
Blackburnian warbler, Setophaga fusca (A)
Yellow warbler, Setophaga petechia
Chestnut-sided warbler, Setophaga pensylvanica (A)
Blackpoll warbler, Setophaga striata (A)
Black-throated blue warbler, Setophaga caerulescens
Palm warbler, Setophaga palmarum
Pine warbler, Setophaga pinus (A)
Yellow-rumped warbler, Setophaga coronata
Yellow-throated warbler, Setophaga dominica
Vitelline warbler, Setophaga vitellina (near-endemic)
Prairie warbler, Setophaga discolor
Townsend's warbler, Setophaga townsendi (A)
Black-throated green warbler, Setophaga virens (A)
Canada warbler, Cardellina canadensis (A)
Wilson's warbler, Cardellina pusilla (A)

Cardinals and allies

Order: PasseriformesFamily: Cardinalidae

The cardinals are a family of robust, seed-eating birds with strong bills. They are typically associated with open woodland. The sexes usually have distinct plumages.

Summer tanager, Piranga rubra
Scarlet tanager, Piranga olivacea (A)
Rose-breasted grosbeak, Pheucticus ludovicianus
Blue grosbeak, Passerina caerulea (A)
Indigo bunting, Passerina cyanea
Painted bunting, Passerina ciris (A)
Dickcissel, Spiza americana (A)

Tanagers and allies

Order: PasseriformesFamily: Thraupidae

The tanagers are a large group of small to medium-sized passerine birds restricted to the New World, mainly in the tropics. Many species are brightly coloured. As a family they are omnivorous, but individual species specialize in eating fruits, seeds, insects, or other types of food. Most have short, rounded wings.

Bananaquit, Coereba flaveola
Yellow-faced grassquit, Tiaris olivaceus
Grand Cayman bullfinch, Melopyrrha taylori (E)

See also
List of birds
Lists of birds by region

References

 
Cayman Islands-related lists
Cayman Islands